Numero 28 is an Italian restaurant chain, headquartered in New York City, with outlets in Austin and Miami Beach.

It opened in February 2012. Rolando Biamonte is a co-owner and founder.

Food
The menu includes round and square Neapolitan-style red and white pizza in three sizes, gluten-free pies, and a trattoria menu of antipasti, parmigiana di melanzane, bruschetta, salads, gnocchi, traditional house-made pastas, negronis, and americanos.  The chef is Ramon Duran, who worked for 40 years at the now-closed Gino’s near Bloomingdales.

Reviews
In 2013, Zagats gave it a food rating of 24, and described its rectangular  pizza pies as "perfectly crisp–crusted from wood-fired brick ovens".

See also
 List of Italian restaurants
 List of restaurants in New York City

References

External links
www.numero28.com

Italian restaurants in the United States
Italian-American culture in New York City
Neapolitan cuisine
Restaurants established in 2012
Restaurants in Manhattan
Upper East Side
American companies established in 2012
2012 establishments in New York City